Futom or Futam may refer to:
 Futom-e Olya
 Futom-e Sofla